Blue Heron Airport  is a privately owned, public use airport in Schoharie County, New York, United States. It is three nautical miles (6 km) northeast of the central business district of Gallupville, New York. It was formerly a private-use facility with the FAA identifier NK93.

Facilities and aircraft 
Blue Heron Airport covers an area of 20 acres (8 ha) at an elevation of 1,200 feet (366 m) above mean sea level. It has one runway designated 9/27 with a turf surface measuring 2,600 by 70 feet (792 x 21 m).

For the 12-month period ending June 11, 2010, the airport had 200 general aviation aircraft operations, an average of 16 per month. At that time there were two ultralight aircraft based at this airport.

References

External links 
  at New York State DOT Airport Directory
 Aerial image as of April 1997 from USGS The National Map
 

Airports in New York (state)
Transportation in Schoharie County, New York